Xnipec (meaning 'dog snout') is a spicy sauce native to the Yucatán peninsula, made with habanero pepper, purple onion, bitter orange juice and salt. Sometimes oregano, vinegar, bay leaf, coriander or pepper are also used. If sweet orange is used, lemon juice can be added to acidify it; if sour orange is used, it is not necessary.

It is also called in a generic way Yucatecan sauce (salsa yucateca) or pickled onions (cebollas encurtidas). Since the Mayan-Spanish transliteration is not standardized, the ways of writing are various; other common spellings are: ixnipec, xnepec, xni'pek, ni'peek, x-ni-pec, xnepek, etc., where peek means 'dog' and ni means 'nose'.

It is similar to another very popular sauce in Mexico, pico de gallo, and it is very present in the peninsular cuisine, where it is used regularly to accompany various typical dishes: chocolomo, salpicón, poc chuc, tikin xic, etc. It is the traditional accompaniment to the popular cochinita pibil, as well as panuchos.

The habanero chili is considered one of the hottest according to the Scoville scale, although the amount of chili added is to taste. Because it is so spicy, anyone who dares to try it is warned that their nose will sweat like a dog's, hence its name.

References 

Cuisine of Yucatán
Hot sauces
Yucatec Maya language
Mexican sauces
Citrus dishes